Javier Melloni Ribas is an Italian-Catalan Jesuit anthropologist and theologian.

Biography

Javier Melloni Ribas was born in Barcelona in 1962; his mother is Catalan and his father, Italian. At 18 he joined the Society of Jesus He became a Jesuit priest, graduated with a degree in cultural anthropology and obtained a PhD inTheology. He currently lives in the Cueva de San Ignacio in Manresa, Catalonia.

Career

Melloni is a Jesuit who became interested in the Ignatius spiritual exercises and acquired thorough knowledge of religious texts. His specializes in interreligious dialogue and comparative mysticism.

He is on the editorial board of journals such as Manresa (a journal of Ignatian spirituality) and Diagonal (a journal of interreligious dialogue). He is the author of essays of different topics focused on spirituality, theology, interreligious dialogue and comparative mysticism. These publications present his theoretical and practical exercises.

Religious perspective

 Interreligious dialogue

Javier Melloni is well known for being a theologian who practices, theorizes and reflects about interreligious dialogue. Melloni proofs the proverb: extra Ecclesiam nulla salus (outside church there is no salvation)   This expression was first formulated by St. Cipriano de Cartago(288): it was resumed and strengthen in the fourteenth century by Boniface VIII in his Bull Unam Sanctam (1302), and submits it to the next level distanced from the actual religion in order to  find essential contact points passing through many religions and that raises them in a purely spiritual way. The ultimate goal is to give Javier Melloni that "respect and acceptance of others, reflecting the opening and donation to Another".

Melloni’s theoretical background involves anthropological, sociological, epistemological and theological factors. For him the interreligious dialogue is as a normal dialogue that needs the participants’ willingness to be open-minded and to detach from oneself in order to enable the existence of others.

Based on his ideology, Javier Melloni states that the interreligious dialogue has two main results: 1) the assumption that religious confession leads to mystery and 2) with that assumption people can embrace the spiritual wealth of humanity.

 Comparative Mysticism 

Javier Melloni has studied comparative mysticism as a complement to interreligious dialogue. He has established that the profound meaning of religious mysticism does not imply an evasion of the actual world but the opportunity of being self-transformed throughout the most significant religious aspects. Comparative mysticism involves a journey throughout the mystical experiences that every religion has.

Work

References

External links
 http://www.covamanresa.cat
 http://www.sjweb.info/

Living people
1962 births